Ilıcakınık is a small village in the Bolu District, Bolu Province, Turkey. Its population is 308 (2021).

References

Villages in Bolu District